One Voice: Vocal Music from Around the World is a world music compilation album originally released in 1997. Part of the World Music Network Rough Guides series, the release features  vocal music, ranging from Gregorian chants to Tuvan throat singing. The compilation was produced by Phil Stanton, co-founder of the World Music Network. Liner notes were written by BBC broadcaster Andy Kershaw, known for his world music journalism. It was produced in partnership with New Internationalist magazine.

Countries represented in this compilation include South Africa, Bulgaria, England, the United States, Italy, Finland, Switzerland, Bahrain, Ireland, Zimbabwe, Tahiti, Tuva and Nepal.

Critical reception

Writing for AllMusic, Adam Greenberg compared the album to Putumayo releases, describing it as more of a "sampler" than the typical Rough Guide "stand-alone compilation". Greenberg felt that while the album "doesn't exactly make sense musically" and lacks a "consistent atmosphere", it does showcase the voice's versatility and beauty.

Track listing

References 

1997 compilation albums
World Music Network Rough Guide albums